Ajaymerukot (Nepali:अजयमेरुकोट) was one of the capital of Doti kingdom established by the Malla kings in 13th century. The ruins of the palace is located in Ajaymeru Rural Municipality in Dadeldhura district which about 3.3 km away from Dadeldhhura, Nepal.

History
The establishment of Ajaymerukot is not verified, but two theory exists. The first one says that it was established in the 13th century by king Ranjana Paal while another theory suggests it was established by two princes of Katyuri dynasity: Sahastra Paal and Niryapaldev before .

Copper inscription by king Niray Paldev from  has been found in the ruins of the palace.

Palace ruins
The ruins of palace consists of a seven storied main palace. A paved stair leads from palace to the bath house. The stone carvings in the face of palace is believed to be carved by Jaad artists from India. A assembly hall is situated in lower section of the palace. For a long period, the ruins were neglected. In 2074 BS, government started conservation effort by making a plan, however the encroachment of the area by local has affected the effort.

References

External links
 Documentary in Nepali

Palaces in Nepal
Historic sites
13th-century establishments in Nepal
Forts in Nepal